OTA Broadcasting, LLC was a broadcasting company founded in 2011 by Michael Dell. The company is based in Fairfax, Virginia.

History
OTA Broadcasting was founded in 2011 by Michael Dell's MSD Capital. It had been rumored that Dell formed OTA Broadcasting to buy stations that could be sold in the Federal Communications Commission (FCC) spectrum auction.

The company's first acquisition was announced in June 2011 when it was announced that it was acquiring KTLN-TV in San Rafael, California. The purchase closed that October.

OTA reached an agreement to purchase WTBL-CD in Lenoir, NC, located in the Charlotte DMA, for $500,000.

On October 4, 2013, Journal Broadcast Group announced that it had entered an agreement to sell KMIR-TV and KPSE-LD in Palm Springs, California to OTA. The acquisition closed in January 2014. KMIR became OTA's first station affiliated with one of the "Big Three" networks.

On April 13, 2017, the FCC announced that OTA's WEMW-CD was a successful bidder in the spectrum auction, and would be surrendering its license in exchange for $12,394,400. OTA surrendered WEMW-CD's license to the FCC for cancellation on July 21, 2017.

Post-spectrum auction
On July 21, 2017, OTA Broadcasting announced its sale of KMIR-TV and KPSE-LD to Entravision Communications for $21 million. The sale  completed November 1, 2017.

On August 7, 2017, it was announced that Nexstar Media Group would acquire the non-spectrum operating assets of WLWC from OTA.

Weigel Broadcasting, on October 25, 2017, announced it would acquire KAXT-CD, KTLN-TV, KFFV, and KVOS-TV for $23.2 million.

NBCUniversal filed an application to purchase WYCN-CD on October 27, 2017.

In November 2017, HC2 Holdings announced they were purchasing low-power television stations from OTA, including WKHU-CD Kittanning, PA, WMVH-CD in Charleroi, PA, WWKH-CD in Uniontown, PA, WWLM-CD in Washington, PA and WJMB-CD in  Butler, PA for $275,000. In a separate deals, HC2 is buying KUGB-CD in Houston for $1.5 million and W21CK-D in Charlotte for $500,000.

On December 5, 2017, Ion exercised an option to buy the WLWC license for $150,000; the deal was made possible by a change in FCC ownership rules that eliminated the requirement that there be at least eight owners of television stations in a market following the formation of a duopoly. Ion also entered into a shared services agreement, retroactive to October 1, to operate WLWC.

Former stations

References

Defunct television broadcasting companies of the United States
Mass media companies established in 2011
Mass media companies disestablished in 2019